Marlon Gomes Claudino (born 14 December 2003) is a Brazilian footballer who plays as a midfielder for Vasco da Gama.

Club career
Born in Rio de Janeiro, Marlon Gomes started his career with Escolinha de Futebol Arena das Nações at the age of five, before a move to Nova Iguaçu at the age of nine. He joined Vasco da Gama in 2017.

International career
Marlon Gomes has represented Brazil at under-16 and under-20 level.

Personal life
Marlon Gomes is the brother of fellow professional footballer Matheus Claudino.

In 2018, shortly after his move to Vasco de Gama, he became father to a daughter, Maitê.

Career statistics

Club

Notes

References

External links

2003 births
Living people
Footballers from Rio de Janeiro (city)
Brazilian footballers
Brazil youth international footballers
Association football midfielders
Campeonato Brasileiro Série B players
Nova Iguaçu Futebol Clube players
CR Vasco da Gama players